Garde-Colombe (Vivaro-Alpine: Garda Colomba) is a commune in the Hautes-Alpes department of southeastern France. The municipality was established on 1 January 2016 and consists of the former communes of Eyguians, Lagrand and Saint-Genis.

The newly minted commune was the location of the 20 July 2016 knife attack on a mother and her three daughters (aged 8, 12, and 14)  at a local VVF Lagrand resort.  The 8-year old was airlifted by helicopter to Grenoble because of a punctured lung.  The perpetrator from Morocco, Mohamed Boufarkouch, shouted "Allah akbar" (Allah is great) several times in jail.  Boufarkouch, who has been on disability since 2009, was in Garde-Colombe with his two daughters and his pregnant wife.  The prosecutor indicated that terrorism is not seen as a prime motivator, and indicated there were "no signs of religious radicalisation" and the suspect's practice of the Muslim religion "has been moderate."

References

See also 
Communes of the Hautes-Alpes department

Gardecolombe

Communes nouvelles of Hautes-Alpes
Populated places established in 2016
2016 establishments in France